Rolf Sohlman (born 12 March 1954) is a Swedish actor and film director. He starred in the 1970 film A Swedish Love Story.

Selected filmography
 A Swedish Love Story (1970)

References

External links

1954 births
Living people
20th-century Swedish male actors
21st-century Swedish male actors
Swedish film directors
Swedish male film actors
Swedish male television actors
Male actors from Stockholm